
Year 401 (CDI) was a common year starting on Tuesday (link will display the full calendar) of the Julian calendar. At the time, it was known as the Year of the Consulship of Vincentius and Fravitus (or, less frequently, year 1154 Ab urbe condita). The denomination 401 for this year has been used since the early medieval period, when the Anno Domini calendar era became the prevalent method in Europe for naming years.

Events

By place

Roman Empire 
 Emperor Arcadius sends many gifts to the Hunnish chieftain Uldin, in appreciation of his victory over the Goths and Gainas. Arcadius then allies himself with the Huns.
 Piracy is committed by slave-traders from Galatia (Turkey), along the coasts of Africa. 
 The old Legio II Adiutrix, part of which had always been stationed at Aquincum (modern Budapest), is divided into two comitatenses, and shipped to Britannia.
 Stilicho, Roman general (magister militum), leads his army in an extensive campaign against the Vandals in Rhaetia (Switzerland).
 The Temple of Artemis near Selçuk in Ephesus is dismantled.
 November 18 – The Visigoths, led by king Alaric I, cross the Alps and invade northern Italy.
 Emperor Honorius begins to use the city of Ravenna as a temporary center for certain administrative and military functions. The city is chosen because of its proximity to the bulk of the Western Roman army and due to the fact that its relative poverty makes it a less tempting target for barbarian invaders than cities such as Rome or Milan. This event is often misinterpreted as the establishment of Ravenna as a capital. In reality, the capital of the Western Roman Empire was not truly established at Ravenna until 408.

Black Sea 
 The Chronicon Pachale (Paschal Chronicle) reports that the Black Sea is completely frozen.

China 
 Kumarajiva, Kuchean Buddhist monk, arrives in Chang'an and begins translating Buddhist texts into Chinese.

By topic

Religion 
 December 19 – Pope Anastasius I dies at Rome after a 2-year reign, and is succeeded by Innocent I as the 40th pope proclaiming his universal power over the whole of Christendom.
 The Mahabharata, an Indian Sanskrit epic, is finalised.

Births 
 April 10 – Theodosius II, Roman emperor (d. 450)
 Aelia Eudocia, Roman empress and wife of Theodosius II (approximate date)
 Leo I, Byzantine Emperor (d. 474)

Deaths 
 December 19 – Pope Anastasius I
 Duan Ye, prince of the Chinese state Northern Liang
 Lü Zuan, emperor of the Di state Later Liang
 Murong Sheng, emperor of the Xianbei state Later Yan (b. 373)
 Empress Yang, wife of Lü Zuan

References